Steven Marsh may refer to:

 Steve Marsh (footballer) (born 1924), Australian rules footballer
 Steve Marsh (cricketer) (born 1961), English cricketer from Kent
 Steve Marsh (comedian) (born 1979), British actor and co-host of the CBeebies programme Big Cook, Little Cook
 Steven Marsh (geneticist), authority on the subject of immunogenetics
 Stephen Marsh (luger) (born 1947), British luger
 Stephen R. Marsh, game writer formerly associated with TSR
 Steven Marsh (game designer), game designer who has worked for Steve Jackson Games